Gary Go, sometimes referred to with the subtitle Of Youth / Of Beauty, is the self-titled debut studio album by British singer, songwriter and producer Gary Go. It was released on 26 May 2009 on Decca Records.

Track listing
-Of Youth-
 "Open Arms" - 5:00
 "So So" - 4:20
 "Engines" - 3:55
 "Wonderful" - 5:10
 "Life Gets in the Way" - 4:05
 "Brooklyn" - 3:35

-Of Beauty-
 "Refuse to Lose" - 4:03
 "Honest" - 4:28
 "Heart and Soul" - 3:54
 "Speak" - 5:01
 "Black and White Days" - 3:32

Not included on the album is the song "Give Me a Reason", which was on the B-side of the single "Wonderful", released on 16 February 2009, and "Take Back Words" which was a B-side of the single "Open Arms", released 18 May 2009. A special edition of the album was available on iTunes as a pre-order, containing stripped down cover versions of Empire of the Sun's "Walking on a Dream", the Cars' "Drive" and Lady Gaga's "Just Dance" featuring Mr Dialysis.

Gary Go released four acoustic tracks exclusively to Napster:

Napster Live Sessions (2009)
 "Wonderful" (Acoustic)
 "Open Arms" (Acoustic)
 "So So" (Acoustic)
 "Black and Gold" (Acoustic cover of Sam Sparro)

The Diary of Rodney Harvey EP (2007)
 "Give Me a Reason"
 "The Diary of Rodney Harvey"
 "So Much for Life"

So So... EP (2006)
 "I Need Your Time"
 "So So"
 "The Good Ones Always Go"
 "Speak"

Credits
Produced by Gary Go with Andreas Eide Larsen.
Recorded by Gary Go, Andreas Eide Larsen and Kevin Killen atAllaire, Avatar, British Grove, iiwii, Sono, Townhouse & The Canvas Room.

Recordings made using the Moonlight Response System [mrs] ®

Mixed by Chris Lord-Alge at Resonate Music & Mix LA.

Gary Go sings, plays pianos, keys, synthesizer tuned percussion and treatments.
John Shannon plays electric and acoustic guitars and sings. 
Andreas E. Larsen plays additional acoustic guitar and sings. 
Doug Wimbish plays bass on “Open Arms”, “Life Gets in the Way”, “Wonderful”, “Speak” and “Refuse to Lose”. 
Mitch Cohn plays bass on “Black & White Days”, “Honest”, “Heart & Soul” and “Engines”. 
Martin Valihora plays drums on all songs except “Open Arms” and “Life Gets in the Way” .
Will Calhoun plays drums on "Open Arms" and "Life Gets in the Way". 
Lisa Fischer sings on “Wonderful”, “Life Gets in the Way”, “Refuse to Lose” and “Honest”. 
Carina Round sings on “Speak”. 
Joseph Arthur sings on “Black & White Days”. 
Luke Pickett sings and plays some acoustic guitar on “Wonderful”. 
Bob Gold plays Hammond Organ on “Honest.” 
Andy Findon plays woodwind on “Honest”. 
Tim Hutton plays horns on “Refuse to Lose”, “Brooklyn” and “Honest”.
Serafina Steer plays harp on “So So”.

Mastered by Ted Jensen at Sterling Sound, NYC.

References

2009 debut albums
Decca Records albums
Pop albums by English artists